Transport in Panama includes a vast network of public buses, metro lines, railways, waterways and airports. The Panama Canal Railway is an expansive railway line that provides transportation for passengers and goods across the country. Panama contains a total of 15,137 km of road transport - these include paved and unpaved roads. The main four expressways are Corredor Sur, Corredor Norte, Autopista La Chorrera and Colón Expressway. With the Panama Canal stretching across the region, it provides an alternative route for the transportation of goods. Additionally, Tocumen International Airport allows air transportation of passengers internationally and is one of the largest airports in Latin America. Transportation issue arises from poor maintenance of road features (especially, traffic lights and street lighting) and poor regulatory enforcement on the roads have been identified. Poor weather conditions from April to December create further hazards for pedestrian and users.

Rail transport

The Panama Canal Railway is the only passenger and freight railway in the country. It is a standard-gauge railway running for 76 km between Colón on the Atlantic coast and Corozal (just outside the capital, Panama City) on the Pacific coast. These are the only two stations on the line. Additionally, a broad-gauge railway exists alongside the locks of the Panama Canal. It is used by electric locomotives ("Mules") that assist in ship handling.

The Panama Metro is a rapid transit system in Panama City. Two lines are currently operational (opened in 2014 and 2019), with further lines planned.

Road transport
 Total: 15,137 km
 paved: 6,351 km (including 149 km of expressways)
 unpaved: 8,785 km (2010)

Panama has well-developed highways in particular, there are four main expressways, all of which are privately owned and require toll payment:

Corredor Sur: Panama City to the Tocumen International Airport, 26 km.
Corredor Norte: Panama City to Tocumen, 30  km.
Autopista La Chorrera: Panama City to La Chorrera, 44 km.
Colón Expressway: Panama City to Colón, 59 km.

Because of recent upgrades, the Pan-American highway has four lanes that run from Panama City to Santiago de Veraguas. Also, a small section of the Pan-American highway from Tocumen to Pacora, counting for 18  km has been upgraded to a freeway. The same is true for the Pan-American stretch between David and Capacho, on the border with Costa Rica, adding 55 km of freeway. The newly built freeway between David and Bajo Boquete, extends for 38 km.  This also applies to the Chitré - Las Tablas freeway that extends for 30 km.

Panama's roads, traffic, and transportation systems are generally safe, however, non-functioning traffic lights are common. Driving is often hazardous and demanding due to dense traffic, undisciplined driving habits, poorly maintained streets, and a lack of effective signs and traffic signals. On roads where poor lighting and driving conditions prevail, night driving is difficult. Night driving is particularly hazardous on the old Panama City – Colon highway.

Buses and taxis are not always maintained in a safe operating condition due to lack of regulatory enforcement, and since 2007 auto insurance has been mandatory in Panama. Traffic in Panama moves on the right, and Panamanian law requires that drivers and passengers wear seat belts, but airbags are not mandatory.

Flooding during the April to December rainy season occasionally makes city streets unusable for most vehicles, and washes out some roads in rural areas. In addition, rural areas are often poorly maintained and lack illumination at night. Such roads are generally less traveled and the availability of emergency roadside assistance is very limited. Road travel is more dangerous during the rainy season and from the time of Carnival through to Good Friday. Carnival starts the Saturday before Ash Wednesday and goes on for four days.

Water transport

There are 800 km of waterways navigable by shallow draft vessels. The Panama Canal runs for 82 km across the country and is an important route for international freight ships traveling between the Atlantic and Pacific oceans.

Pipelines
The Trans-Panama pipeline carries crude oil for 130 km.

Ports and harbors

Atlantic Ocean
 Manzanillo (part of Colón province)
 Coco Solo

Pacific Ocean
Balboa

Merchant marine

Panama has an extensive international ship register, comprising 7,860 ships. Most are owned by foreign countries, with Panama being a flag of convenience.

As of 2019, the ship types were: Bulk carrier (2,567), container ship (609), general cargo (1,325), oil tanker (798), and others (2,561).

Air transport

Tocumen International Airport is the primary international airport, located just east of Panama City. It is the hub of flag carrier Copa Airlines. Scheduled services operate to destinations in the Americas, Europe, Asia and the Middle East.

There are 117 airports across the country, 57 with paved runways and 60 with unpaved runways.

See also
 Panama
 Panama Railway
 Rail transport by country

References

External links